The Archdiocese of the Goths and the Northlands is a church which is part of the Russian Catacomb Church of True Orthodox Christians which self-identifies as Eastern Orthodox, however it is not recognized by, or in communion with any other Eastern Orthodox Christian Church. 

The church claims to be affiliated with the Russian True Orthodox Church (also known as "catacombists", a splinter group not to be confused with the Russian Orthodox Church).

Creation 
It has been a registered ecclesiastical and religious body in Sweden since 2008.

It claims apostolic succession through the Russian True Orthodox Church, and territorial jurisdiction deriving from the Metropolitanate of Gothia and Kaphas, the church of the Crimean Goths in the Principality of Theodoro. The Metropolitanate of Gothia was under the jurisdiction of the Ecumenical Patriarch until 1783, when, subsequent to the Russian conquest of the Crimea, it was transferred to the Russian Orthodox Church.

It also claims to be  the earliest Church authority in Scandinavia, with presence preceding the Ansgar mission, allegedly with the (now ruined) St Laurentius Church in the island of Gotland.

Historiography of the church 
According to  Aleksey "Ambrosius" Sievers, Christianity came to the Goths as early as the mid-1st century by a missionary journey of  Andrew the Apostle, long before their conversion to Arianism under the episcopate of Ulfilas. "The 'eastern' ecclesiastical jurisdiction in Västergötland, Östgötaland and in Gotland was so obvious to anyone at the time that even Rome sent its missionary bishop, Saint Ansgar, to Svealand where Christianity in comparison was relativelly weak at that time. It's fairly realistic to speak of Old Gothic (Byzantine) and Celtic (a little later Anglo-Saxon) influence in Sweden, instead of Roman".

These claims run counter to the general 20th-century consensus of historians, but there is some more recent research which seems to corroborate that Christianity may have been present in Sweden earlier than previously thought, from as early as the 8th or 9th century, via Byzantine transmission. This supposed cultural contact reflects the Viking Age (9th-century) Swedish expansion eastward, establishing the so-called Rus' Khaganate on the margins of the Byzantine sphere of influence.

References

Literature

External links
  

Catacomb Church
Eastern Orthodoxy in Sweden